Sir Sunderlal Hospital (SSH-BHU) is a teaching hospital affiliated with the Institute of Medical Sciences, Banaras Hindu University (IMS-BHU) in Varanasi, India. Located on the BHU campus, it is the largest tertiary referral hospital in Eastern Uttar Pradesh state.

History
Sir Sunderlal Hospital was established in 1926 and is named for the first Vice Chancellor of BHU, Sir Sunder Lal. It has grown from its initial size of 96 beds to 927 beds, as of 2011.

References

Hospital buildings completed in 1926
Hospitals in Uttar Pradesh
Teaching hospitals in India
Banaras Hindu University
1926 establishments in India
20th-century architecture in India